Triploechus novus is a species of bee flies, insects in the family Bombyliidae.

References

Bombyliidae
Articles created by Qbugbot
Insects described in 1893